was a Japanese geisha and prostitute who murdered her lover, via strangulation on May 18, 1936, before cutting off his penis and testicles and carrying them around with her in her kimono. The story became a national sensation in Japan, acquiring mythic overtones, and has been interpreted by artists, philosophers, novelists and filmmakers. Abe was released after serving five years in prison and went on to write an autobiography.

Family background
Sada Abe was the seventh of eight children of Shigeyoshi and Katsu Abe, an upper middle-class family of tatami mat makers in Tokyo's Kanda neighborhood. Only four of the Abe children survived to adulthood, and of those Sada was the youngest. Sada's father, originally from Chiba Prefecture, had been adopted into the Abe family to help with the business, which he eventually inherited. Aged 52 at the time of Sada's birth, Shigeyoshi Abe was described by police as "an honest and upright man" who had neither conspicuous vices nor any brushes with the law, although some acquaintances reported him to be somewhat self-centered, with a taste for extravagance. Likewise, Sada's mother had no known legal or moral blemishes on her record.

Sada's brother Shintarō was known as a womanizer, and, after his marriage, ran away with his parents' money. Her sister Teruko was also known to have had several lovers. Sada's father sent Teruko to work in a brothel, then not an uncommon way to punish female sexual promiscuity in Japan, although he soon bought her back. Teruko's past was not considered a hindrance to marriage for those of the Abes' class at the time, and she soon married.

Early life
Abe was born in 1905. Her mother doted on Sada, who was her youngest surviving child, and allowed her to do as she wished. Geisha were considered glamorous celebrities at the time, and Abe herself pursued this image by skipping school for her music lessons and wearing stylish make-up.

As family problems over her siblings, sister Teruko and brother Shintarō, became more pressing, Abe was often sent out of the house alone. She soon fell in with a group of similarly independent teenagers.  At the age of 14, during one of her outings with this group, she was raped by one of her acquaintances (Keio University student). Her parents initially defended and supported her, but she became a difficult teenager. As Abe became more irresponsible and uncontrollable, her parents sold her to a geisha house in Yokohama in 1922, hoping to find her a place in society with some direction.  Toku Abe, Sada's oldest sister, testified that Sada wished to become a geisha. Sada herself, however, claimed that her father made her a geisha as punishment for her promiscuity.

Abe's encounter with the geisha world proved to be a frustrating and disappointing one. To become a true star among geisha required apprenticeship from childhood, with years spent training and studying arts and music. Abe never progressed beyond a low rank, and one of her main duties was to provide sex for clients. She worked for five years in this capacity and eventually contracted syphilis. Since this meant she would be required to undergo regular physical examinations, just as a legally licensed prostitute would, Abe decided to enter this better-paying profession.

Early 1930s

Abe began work as a prostitute in Osaka's famous Tobita brothel district, but soon gained a reputation as a trouble-maker. She stole money from clients and attempted to leave the brothel several times, but was soon tracked down by the well-organized legal prostitution system.  After two years, Abe eventually succeeded in escaping the licensed prostitution system and began working as a waitress. However, not satisfied with the wages, she was soon working as a prostitute again, though now unlicensed, and began working in the unlicensed brothels of Osaka in 1932. Abe's mother died in January 1933, and Abe traveled to Tokyo to visit her father, and her mother's grave. She entered into the prostitution market in Tokyo and while there became a mistress for the first time. When her father became gravely ill in January 1934, Abe nursed him for ten days until his death.

In October 1934, Abe was arrested in a police raid on the unlicensed brothel at which she was working at the time. Kinnosuke Kasahara, a well-connected friend of the brothel owner, arranged for her release. Kasahara was attracted to Abe, finding that she had no debts, and with Abe's agreement, made her his mistress. He set up a house for Abe on December 20, 1934, and also provided her with an income. In his deposition to the police, he remembered, "She was really strong, a real powerful one. Even though I am pretty jaded, she was enough to astound me. She wasn't satisfied unless we did it two, three, or four times a night. To her, it was unacceptable unless I had my hand on her private parts all night long… At first it was great, but after a couple of weeks I got a little exhausted." When Abe suggested that Kasahara leave his wife to marry her, he refused. She then asked Kasahara to allow her to take another lover, which he also refused to do. Afterwards, their relationship ended, and to escape him Abe left for Nagoya. Kasahara ended his testimony with an angry remark about Abe: "She is a slut and a whore. And as what she has done makes clear, she is a woman whom men should fear." Likewise, Abe remembered Kasahara in less than flattering terms, saying, "He didn't love me and treated me like an animal. He was the kind of scum who would then plead with me when I said that we should break up."

In Nagoya in 1935, again intending to leave the sex industry, Abe began working as a maid at a restaurant. She soon became romantically involved with a customer at the restaurant, Gorō Ōmiya, a professor and banker who aspired to become a member of the Diet of Japan (Japanese parliament). Knowing that the restaurant would not tolerate a maid having sexual relations with clients, and having become bored with Nagoya, she returned to Tokyo in June. Ōmiya met Abe in Tokyo and, finding that she had previously contracted syphilis, paid for her stay at a hot springs resort in Kusatsu from November until January 1936. In January, Ōmiya suggested that Abe could become financially independent by opening a small restaurant, and recommended that she should start working as an apprentice in the restaurant business.

Acquaintance with Kichizō Ishida
Back in Tokyo, Abe began work as an apprentice at the Yoshidaya restaurant on February 1, 1936. The owner of this establishment, Kichizō Ishida, 42 at the time, had worked his way up in the business, starting as an apprentice at a restaurant specializing in eel dishes. He had opened Yoshidaya in Tokyo's Nakano neighborhood in 1920. When Abe joined his restaurant, Ishida had become known as a womanizer who by that time did little in the way of actually running the restaurant, which had become in fact managed primarily by his wife.

Not long after Abe began work at Yoshidaya, Ishida began making amorous advances towards her. Ōmiya had never satisfied Abe sexually, and she was responsive to Ishida's approaches. In mid-April, Ishida and Abe initiated their sexual relationship in the restaurant to the accompaniment of a romantic ballad sung by one of the restaurant's geisha. On April 23, 1936, Abe and Ishida met for a pre-arranged sexual encounter at a teahouse, or —the contemporary equivalent of a love hotel—in the Shibuya neighborhood. Planning only for a short "fling", the couple instead remained in bed for four days. On the night of April 27, they moved to another teahouse in the distant neighborhood of Futako Tamagawa where they continued to drink and have sex, occasionally with the accompaniment of a geisha's singing, and would continue even as maids entered the room to serve sake.  They next moved to the Ogu neighborhood. Ishida did not actually return to his restaurant until the morning of May 8, after an absence of about two weeks.  Of Ishida, Abe later said, "It is hard to say exactly what was so good about Ishida. But it was impossible to say anything bad about his looks, his attitude, his skill as a lover, the way he expressed his feelings. I had never met such a sexy man."

After their two-week encounter ended, Abe became agitated and began drinking excessively. She said that with Ishida she had come to know true love for the first time in her life, and the thought of Ishida being back with his wife made her intensely jealous. Just over a week before Ishida's eventual death, Abe began to contemplate his murder. On May 9, 1936, she attended a play in which a geisha attacks her lover with a large knife, after which she decided to threaten Ishida with a knife at their next meeting. On May 11, Abe pawned some of her clothing and used the money to buy a kitchen knife. She later described meeting Ishida that night, "I pulled the kitchen knife out of my bag and threatened him as had been done in the play I had seen, saying, 'Kichi, you wore that kimono just to please one of your favorite customers. You bastard, I'll kill you for that.' Ishida was startled and drew away a little, but he seemed delighted with it all…"

Murder of Ishida

Ishida and Abe returned to Ogu, where they remained until his death. During their love-making this time, Abe put the knife to the base of Ishida's penis, and said she would make sure he would never play around with another woman. Ishida laughed at this. Two nights into this bout of sex, Abe began choking Ishida, and he told her to continue, saying that this increased his pleasure (erotic asphyxiation). She had him do it to her as well. On the evening of May 16, 1936, Abe used her  to cut off Ishida's breathing during orgasm, and they both enjoyed it. They repeated this for two more hours. Once Abe stopped the strangulation, Ishida's face became distorted, and would not return to its normal appearance. Ishida took thirty tablets of a sedative called Calmotin to try to soothe his pain. According to Abe, as Ishida started to doze, he told her, "You'll put the cord around my neck and squeeze it again while I'm sleeping, won't you…  If you start to strangle me, don't stop, because it is so painful afterwards." Abe commented that she wondered if he had wanted her to kill him, but on reflection decided he must have been joking.

At about 2 am on May 18, 1936, as Ishida was asleep, Abe wrapped her sash twice around his neck and strangled him to death. She later told police, "After I had killed Ishida I felt totally at ease, as though a heavy burden had been lifted from my shoulders, and I felt a sense of clarity." After lying with Ishida's body for a few hours, she next severed his penis and testicles with the kitchen knife, wrapped them in a magazine cover, and kept them until her arrest three days later.  With the blood she wrote  on Ishida's left thigh, and on a bed sheet. She then carved  ("Sada", the character for her name) into his left arm. After putting on Ishida's underwear, she left the inn at about 8 am, telling the staff not to disturb Ishida.

After leaving the inn, Abe met her former lover Gorō Ōmiya. She repeatedly apologized to him, but Ōmiya, unaware of the murder, assumed that she was apologizing for having taken another lover. In actuality, Abe's apologies were for the damage to his political career that she knew his association with her was bound to cause. After Ishida's body was discovered, a search was launched for Abe, who had gone missing. On May 19, 1936, the newspapers picked up the story. Ōmiya's career was ruined, and Abe's life was under intense public scrutiny from that point onwards.

Abe Sada panic
The circumstances of Ishida's death immediately caused a national sensation. The ensuing frenzy over the search for Abe was called "Abe Sada panic". Police received reports of sightings of Abe from various cities, and one false sighting nearly caused a stampede in the Ginza, resulting in a large traffic jam. In a reference to the recent failed coup in Tokyo, the February 26 Incident or " Incident" ("2–26" or "February 26"), the crime was satirically dubbed the "Go Ichi-Hachi" Incident ("5–18" or "May 18").

On May 19, 1936, Abe went shopping and saw a movie. Under a pseudonym, she stayed in an inn in Shinagawa on May 20, where she had a massage and drank three bottles of beer. She spent the day writing farewell letters to Ōmiya, a friend, and Ishida. Abe planned to commit suicide one week after the murder, and practiced necrophilia. "I felt attached to Ishida's penis and thought that only after taking leave from it quietly could I then die. I unwrapped the paper holding them and gazed at his penis and scrotum. I put his penis in my mouth and even tried to insert it inside me…  It didn't work however though I kept trying and trying. Then, I decided that I would flee to Osaka, staying with Ishida's penis all the while. In the end, I would jump from a cliff on Mount Ikoma while holding on to his penis."

At 4:00 in the afternoon, police detectives, suspicious of the alias under which Abe had registered, came to her room. "Don't be so formal," she told them, "You're looking for Sada Abe, right? Well that's me. I am Sada Abe." When the police were not convinced, she displayed Ishida's genitalia as proof.

Abe was arrested and interrogated over eight sessions. When asked why she had severed Ishida's genitalia, Abe replied, "Because I couldn't take his head or body with me. I wanted to take the part of him that brought back to me the most vivid memories." The interrogating officer was struck by Abe's demeanor when asked why she had killed Ishida. "Immediately she became excited and her eyes sparkled in a strange way." Her answer was: "I loved him so much, I wanted him all to myself. But since we were not husband and wife, as long as he lived he could be embraced by other women. I knew that if I killed him no other woman could ever touch him again, so I killed him…" In attempting to explain what distinguished Abe's case from over a dozen other similar cases in Japan, William Johnston suggests that it is this answer which captured the imagination of the nation: "She had killed not out of jealousy but out of love." Mark Schreiber notes that the Sada Abe Incident occurred at a time when the Japanese media were preoccupied with extreme political and military troubles, including the  Incident and a looming war in China. He suggests that a sensationalistic sex scandal such as this served as a welcome national release from the disturbing events of the time.

When the details of the crime were made public, rumors began to circulate that Ishida's penis was of extraordinary size; however, the police officer who interrogated Abe after her arrest denied this, saying, "Ishida's was just average. [Abe] told me, 'Size doesn't make a man in bed. Technique and his desire to please me were what I liked about Ishida. After her arrest, Ishida's penis and testicles were moved to Tokyo University Medical School's pathology museum. They were put on public display soon after the end of World War II, but have since disappeared.

Conviction and sentencing
The first day of Abe's trial was November 25, 1936, and by 5 a.m. crowds were already gathering to attend. The judge presiding over the trial admitted to being sexually aroused by some of the details involved in the case, yet made sure that the trial was held with the utmost seriousness. Abe's statement before receiving sentencing began, "The thing I regret most about this incident is that I have come to be misunderstood as some kind of sexual pervert…  There had never been a man in my life like Ishida. There were men I liked, and with whom I slept without accepting money, but none made me feel the way I did toward him."

On December 21, 1936, Abe was convicted of murder and mutilation of a corpse. Though the prosecution demanded ten years, and Abe claimed that she desired the death penalty, she was in fact sentenced to just six years in prison. Abe was confined in Tochigi women's penitentiary, where she was prisoner No. 11. Her sentence was commuted on November 10, 1940, on the occasion of the 2,600th anniversary celebrations of the mythical founding of Japan, when Emperor Jimmu came to the throne.  Abe was released, exactly five years after the murder, on May 17, 1941.

The police record of Abe's interrogation and confession became a national best-seller in 1936. In the wake of popular "poison woman" literature, confessional autobiographies by female criminals had begun appearing in the late 1890s. By the early 1910s, autobiographical writings by criminal women took on an unapologetic tone and sometimes included criticisms of Japan and Japanese society. Kanno Suga, who was hanged in 1911 for conspiring to assassinate Emperor Meiji in what was known as the High Treason Incident, wrote openly rebellious essays while in prison. Fumiko Kaneko, who was sentenced to death for plotting to bomb the imperial family, used her notoriety to speak against the imperial system and the racism and paternalism that she said it engendered. Abe's confession, in the years since its appearance, became the most circulated female criminal narrative in Japan. Marran points out that Abe, unlike previous criminal autobiographers, stressed her sexuality and the love she felt for her victim.

Later life
Upon release from prison, Abe assumed an alias. As the mistress of a "serious man" she referred to in her memoirs as "Y", she moved first to Ibaraki Prefecture and then to Saitama Prefecture. When Abe's true identity became known to Y's friends and family, she broke off their relationship.

In the aftermath of World War II, wishing to divert public attention from politics and criticism of the occupying authorities, the Yoshida government encouraged a "3-S" policy—"sports, screen, and sex".  Pre-war writings, such as The Psychological Diagnosis of Abe Sada (1937) depict Abe as an example of the dangers of unbridled female sexuality and as a threat to the patriarchal system. In the postwar era, she was treated as a critic of totalitarianism, and a symbol of freedom from oppressive political ideologies.  Abe became a popular subject in literature of both high and low quality. The  writer Sakunosuke Oda wrote two stories based on Abe, and a June 1949 article noted that Abe had recently tried to clear her name after it had been used in a "mountain" of erotic books.

In 1946, the writer Ango Sakaguchi interviewed Abe, treating her as an authority on both sexuality and freedom. He called Abe a "tender, warm figure of salvation for future generations."  In 1947, Ichiro Kimura's The Erotic Confessions of Abe Sada became a national bestseller, with over 100,000 copies sold. The book was in the form of an interview with Abe, but was actually based on the police interrogation records. As a response to this book, Abe wrote her own autobiography, Memoirs of Abe Sada, which was published in 1948. In contrast to Kimura's depiction of her as a pervert, she stressed her love for Ishida.  The first edition of the magazine , in January 1948, featured previously unpublished photos of the incident with the headline "Ero-guro of the Century! First Public Release. Pictorial of the Abe Sada Incident." Reflecting the change in tone in writings on Abe, the June 1949 issue of Monthly Reader called her a "Heroine of That Time" for following her own desires in a time of "false morality" and oppression.

Abe capitalized on her notoriety by sitting for an interview in a popular magazine, and appearing for several years starting in 1947 in a traveling one-act stage production called  (A Woman of the Shōwa Period) under the direction of dramatist Nagata Mikihiko.  In 1952 she began working at the Hoshikikusui,> a working-class pub in Inari-chō in downtown Tokyo. Abe lived a low-profile life in Tokyo's Shitaya neighborhood for the next 20 years, and her neighborhood restaurant association gave her a "model employee" award. More than once, during the 1960s, film-critic Donald Richie visited the Hoshikikusui. In his collection of profiles, Japanese Portraits, he describes Abe making a dramatic entrance into a boisterous group of drinkers. She would slowly descend a long staircase that led into the middle of the crowd, fixing a haughty gaze on individuals in her audience. The men in the pub would respond by putting their hands over their crotches, and shouting out things like, "Hide the knives!" and "I'm afraid to go and pee!" Abe would slap the banister in anger and stare the crowd into an uncomfortable and complete silence, and only then continue her entrance, chatting and pouring drinks from table to table. Richie comments, "…she had actually choked a man to death and then cut off his member.  It was a consequent frisson when Sada Abe slapped your back."

In 1969, Abe appeared in the "Sada Abe Incident" section of director Teruo Ishii's dramatized documentary , and the last known photograph of Abe was taken in August of that year. She disappeared from the public eye in 1970. When the film In the Realm of the Senses was being planned in the mid-1970s, director Nagisa Ōshima apparently sought out Abe and, after a long search, found her, her hair shorn, in a Kansai nunnery.

Legacy
Decades after both the incident and her disappearance, Abe continues to draw public interest:
 Mutsuo Toi took an interest in Abe's case and had started writing a novel, . Two years after Abe's crime, Toi perpetrated the deadliest single-shooter massacre in Japanese history before killing himself.
 In addition to the documentary in which Abe herself appeared shortly before she disappeared from the public eye, and the 1976 Japanese-language In the Realm of the Senses, at least three successful films have been made based on the story. The 1983 film, Sexy Doll: Abe Sada Sansei, made use of Abe's name in the title. In 1998, a 438-page biography of Abe was published in Japan, and the first full-length book on Abe in English, William Johnston's Geisha, Harlot, Strangler, Star: A Woman, Sex, and Morality in Modern Japan, was published in 2005.
 Japanese Noise musician Merzbow adopted the alias Abe Sada for an early musical project. He released only one record under this name, the 1994 7" Original Body Kingdom/Gala Abe Sada 1936.
 In March 2007, a four-bass noise band from Perth, Australia, named Abe Sada won a Contemporary Music Grant from the Australian Department of Culture and the Arts to tour Japan in June and July 2007.

Sada Abe in literature
 
 
 
 
 
 
 
 Satō, Makoto. Abe Sada's Dogs, avant-garde play.
 Sekine, Hiroshi (1971). "Abe Sada", poem.
 Tōkyō Seishin Bunsekigaku Kenkyōjo (1937). The Psychoanalytic Diagnosis of Sada Abe (Abe Sada no seishin bunseki teki shindan).
  (novel modeled on the Abe Incident)

Sada Abe in film
Abe herself appeared in the "Sada Abe Incident" section of Teruo Ishii's 1969 documentary ; actress Yukie Kagawa portrayed Abe.

There have also been at least six films based on her life:
 1975 – Noboru Tanaka's A Woman Called Sada Abe was released, for a Japan-only audience, but was overshadowed internationally by its more explicit successor that came out the following year.
 1976 – Nagisa Oshima's In the Realm of the Senses which was widely banned following its release, for explicit scenes of sex and nudity.
 1998 – Nobuhiko Obayashi's Sada starring Hitomi Kuroki.
 1999 – Sachi Hamano's 
 2009 – Pure, starring Asa Akira
 2011 – Kyōko Aizome's

See also
 List of people who disappeared
 Lorena Bobbitt
 Sadao Abe, Japanese actor whose stage name comes from Sada Abe

Notes

References

 (Review of Johnston, William. Geisha, Harlot, Strangler, Star)

External links

1905 births
1970s deaths
1970s missing person cases
20th-century Japanese women writers
20th-century Japanese writers
Geishas
Human trophy collecting
Japanese autobiographers
Japanese female murderers
Japanese people convicted of murder
Japanese prostitutes
Missing people
Missing person cases in Japan
People convicted of murder by Japan
People from Tokyo
Sex scandals
Women autobiographers